Tab Mix Plus (often abbreviated TMP) was a Mozilla Firefox extension that adds to the tabbed browsing functions in Firefox. It was a popular extension on Mozilla Add-ons, which records download statistics. TMP is a collection of features from other extensions built in one package.  Lifehacker named it one of their "Top 10 must-have Firefox extensions" for 2009. PC World said that "With Tab Mix Plus, Firefox tabs go past the obvious and into the indispensable... it's hard to imagine how you lived without it." As the only extension providing multi-row tab support, Wired and CNET both called it a "must-have" that is "powerful" and "gives you what feels like an infinite amount of control over tab behaviour."

The original Tab Mix Plus ceased to be compatible with Firefox upon the release of Firefox 57 Quantum, due to the switch to the WebExtensions interface.  A complete rewrite of the extension under development build has been released, called Tab Mix WebExtension, with limited features and not yet compatible with Quantum.

Functions

The Add-Ons functions include:

 Duplicates tabs
 Opens a new tab with the same page and back/forward history.
 Controls tab focus
 Allows the user to choose whether new tabs will be selected when created by various events (such as linking, opening bookmarks, etc.).
 Additional rows of tabs
 JavaScript decompiling
 Allows JavaScript to be forced into a separate tab instead of a pop-up box, and allows the user to view the URL of the JavaScript page.
 Changes handling of input
 Various combinations of mouse clicks, points, and key-presses can be assigned to activate tab-related functions, such as opening, closing and duplicating individual tabs or groups thereof.
 Reopen closed tabs and windows
 Saves information about tabs and windows as they are closed, allowing the user to "undo" closing them. The reopened page will reopen in the condition it was at the moment it was closed - including containing any text the user had typed into text boxes thereon - such as those on a Wikipedia edit page.
 Session Manager and Crash Recovery
 Saves the current set of open windows and tabs (and associated history), at a preset interval and/or on command. This allows the user to recover from a crash, or to deliberately save the current session, to return to it at a later date, or share a copy with another user.
 While Firefox contains a basic session manager functions, Tab Mix Plus has greater functionality in this area. In turn, the Session Manager extension has additional session management functions beyond those of Tab Mix Plus. These two extensions are known to "play nicely together": Tab Mix Plus detects the presence of Session Manager and deactivates its own session management functions, deferring to Session Manager.

Criticism
Critics  point out that TMP is quite large and may be experiencing software bloat.

Versions
Two versions of Tab Mix Plus are generally available at any given time:

 An "official release" version
 Intended for general use, this is publicly available from the Mozilla Add-ons website.
 These releases have passed the Mozilla Add-ons review process.
 A "development" or "pre-release" version
 Intended for testing by interested users prior to release, this is available only from the developers' own website.

Firefox version compatibility

Versions of Tab Mix Plus are available for virtually all releases of Firefox prior to Firefox 57.

The release of Firefox 57 Quantum marked the switchover from XUL-based AddOns—which allow extensions to make arbitrary changes to Firefox code—to the WebExtensions API, which strictly limits how much control extensions have over the browser and interface.  Because the original Tab Mix Plus is a XUL-based extension, it does not work with Firefox 57 or higher.  A complete rewrite of the extension, called Tab Mix WebExtension, is in progress, and a development build with limited functionality has been released.

See also
List of Firefox extensions

References

External links 
 Tab Mix Plus official homepage
 Tab Mix Plus Palemoon and Firefox
 Tab Mix Plus User Manual 
 Tab Mix Plus at Mozilla Addons

Free Firefox legacy extensions
Pale Moon extensions